Sam Mehran (August 17, 1985 – July 28, 2018) was an American-Australian musician, songwriter, and producer who co-founded the punk band Test Icicles and later formed the solo projects Matrix Metals and Outer Limits Recordings (OLR). His solo work differed substantially from Test Icicles and was often produced in a lo-fi manner. He received little critical notice in his lifetime, a Dazed Digital editor commented, however, "Mehran possessed an incomparable talent that belied his relatively low public profile."

Career 

Mehran, along with Rory Attwell, founded Test Icicles in 2004. The band was active until 2006, when it broke up. Mehran began releasing music under the alias Outer Limits Recordings in 2010, which was immediately associated with the era's loose-knit, early hypnagogic pop and chillwave scene. He described himself being influenced mostly by Ariel Pink, R. Stevie Moore, and "basically most music that was recorded before 1990." Music journalist Paul Lester characterized OLR as "heavenly hooks and catchy choruses". Marc Masters of The Wire compared his Foxy Baby album to Ariel Pink's "AM pop blender", and described the Matrix Metals album Flamingo Breeze as a "mini-masterpiece of sub-disco loops".

OLR issued numerous cassette tapes and limited edition vinyl discs, and according to Mehran, the project lasted until "somewhere in the spring of 2011". Its first LP release was the compilation Singles, Demos and Rarities (2007-2010), released on April 15, 2013, and was intended to be its only album. A follow-up, Birds, Bees, Babys, Bacteria, was issued on cassette later that year. After OLR, Mehran  co-wrote and co-produced Katie Rush's Law of Attraction (2014). He then produced Puro Instinct's Autodrama (2016) and Samantha Urbani's Policies of Power (2017).

His last work released before his death was his co-writing and co-production of Ssion's O (2018). Prior to his death, he was working on co-writing and production of Katie Rush's second and third albums, and a debut EP with Marion Belle.  The second Katie Rush album Stage Life was released postmortem in April 2019, and his album with Belle was released in August 2019.

Death
Mehran died by suicide at his home in Hollywood on July 28, 2018, aged 31. His body was found the following morning. The album, titled Cold Brew, was eventually released on July 28, 2021, the third anniversary of his death.

Discography

Studio albums
 Mind Surfers Installation 04/12/08 (2009) 
 Bermuda Telepaths (2009) 
 Flashback Repository (2009) 
 Flamingo Breeze (2009) 
 Foxy Baby (2009) 
 Wingdings I: Return to Earth (2009) 
 Wingdings II: Zarathustra's Puzzle (2009) 
 Wingdings III: Symbol of Infinity (2009) 
 So Unreal (2011) 
 I Kontact (2012) 
 Birds, Bees, Babys, Bacteria (2013) 
 Birds, Bees, Babys, Bacteria (GTVR Edition) (2016) 
 Cold Brew (2021) 

Compilation
 Singles, Demos & Rarities 2007-2010 (2013) 

See also
 For Screening Purposes Only (2005) 
 Megafauna (2009) 
 The Flower Lane (2013)

References

External links
 
 
 

1985 births
2018 deaths
2018 suicides
21st-century American male musicians
Hypnagogic pop musicians
Lo-fi musicians
Musicians from Miami
Suicides in California
Test Icicles members